Maurus was the first disciple of Benedict of Nursia (512–584). He is mentioned in Gregory the Great's biography of the latter as the first oblate, offered to the monastery by his noble Roman parents as a young boy to be brought up in the monastic life.

Four stories involving Maurus recounted by Gregory formed a pattern for the ideal formation of a Benedictine monk. The most famous of these involved Saint Maurus's rescue of Placidus, a younger boy offered to Benedict at the same time as Maurus. The incident has been reproduced in many medieval and Renaissance paintings.

Maurus is venerated on January 15 in the 2001 Roman Martyrology and on the same date along with Placid in the Proper Masses for the Use of the Benedictine Confederation.

Legendary life of Saint Maurus
A long Life of St. Maurus appeared in the late 9th century, supposedly composed by one of Maurus's 6th-century contemporaries. According to this account, the bishop of Le Mans, in western France, sent a delegation asking Benedict for a group of monks to travel from Benedict's new abbey of Monte Cassino to establish monastic life in France according to the Rule of St. Benedict. The Life recounts the long journey of Maurus and his companions from Italy to France, accompanied by many adventures and miracles as Maurus is transformed from the youthful disciple of Benedict into a powerful, miracle-working holy man in his own right. According to this account, after the great pilgrimage to Francia, Maurus founded Glanfeuil Abbey as the first Benedictine monastery in Gaul. It was located on the south bank of the Loire river, a few miles east of Angers. The nave of its thirteenth-century church and some vineyards remain today (according to tradition, the chenin grape was first cultivated at this monastery.)

Scholars such as Hippolyte Delehaye believe that this Life of Maurus is a forgery by the late-9th-century abbot of Glanfeuil, Odo. It was composed, as were many such saints' lives in Carolingian France, to popularize local saints' cults. The bones of Maurus were 'discovered' at Glanfeuil by one of Odo's immediate predecessors, Gauzlin, in 845. Gauzlin likely invented or at least strongly promoted the cult of Benedict's disciple, taking advantage of Glanfeuil's proximity to two famous and prosperous Benedictine culture centers of the Loire region: the cult of Saint Benedict's bones at Fleury and that of Saint Scholastica's relics at Le Mans.
Note 1. Mab. Annal. Ben. T. 1. l. 7. ad annos 581. 584. [back]
Note 2. All writers, at least from the ninth century, are unanimous in affirming with Amalarius, that St. Maurus of Anjou, the French abbot, was the same Maurus that was the disciple of St. Benedict; which is also proved against certain modern critics, by Dom Ruinart in his Apologia Missionis St. Mauri, in append. 1. annal. Bened. per Mabill. T. 1. p. 630. The arguments which are alleged by some for distinguishing them, may be seen in Chatelain’s notes on the Martyrol. p. 253. In imitation of the congregation of SS. Vane and Hydulphus, then lately established in Lorrain, certain French Benedictin monks instituted a like reformation of their order, under the title of the congregation of Saint Maurus, in 1621, which was approved of by Gregory XV. and Urban VIII. It is divided into six provinces, under its own general, who usually resides at St. Germain-des-Prez, at Paris. These monks live in strict retirement, and constantly abstain from flesh meat, except in the infirmary. Their chief houses are, St. Maur-sur-Loire, St. Germain-des-Prez, Fleury, or St . Benoit-sur-Loire. Marmoutier at Tours, Vendome, St. Remigius at Rheims, St. Peter of Corbie, Fecam, &c

Benedictine tradition

Maurus was born c. 510, the son of Equitius, a Roman nobleman. At the age of about twelve, Maurus was entrusted to the care of St. Benedict at Subiaco to be educated. Gregory the Great in the Dialogues recounts a tale wherein the young oblate Placidus was sent to fetch water from the lake and was carried away by the current. Realizing this, Benedict sent Maurus to rescue the boy. Hurrying to reach Placidus, Maurus ran out upon the water. After bringing Placidus back to shore, Maurus attributed the miracle to the prayers of St. Benedict; the abbot, to his disciple's obedience.

Maurus was ordained a deacon, and subsequently Benedict, prior to leaving for Monte Cassino, appointed him coadjutor at Subiaco. During his tenure, various miraculous cures were attributed to his prayers. Around 528, Benedict summoned Maurus to join him at Monte Cassino.

Around 543, Innocentius, the Bishop of Mans, sent his vicar, Adenard, to Monte Cassino to request Benedict to send some monks to Gaul. Maurus was dispatched and, during the journey, obtained a number of cures for the sick and injured encountered along the way. Through the generosity of King Theudebert, he founded Glanfeuil Abbey, which he governed for many years. He resigned the abbacy in 581 to spend the remainder of his life in solitude and prayer. The abbey of Glanfeuil, was later called St. Maur-sur-Loire. Maurus died at Glanfeuil Abbey 15 January 584.

Veneration
Maurus was originally buried in the abbey church at Glanfeuil. When, in 868, Odo and the monks of Glanfeuil were obliged to flee to Paris in the face of Vikings marauding along the Loire, the remains of St. Maurus were translated to the abbey of Saint-Pierre-des-Fossés, later renamed Saint-Maur-des-Fossés. In 1750 the relics were relocated to Saint-Germain-des-Prés, where they remained until dispersed by a Parisian mob during the French Revolution. Maurus is still venerated by Benedictine congregations today, many monks adopting his name and dedicating monasteries to his patronage.

The cult of Saint Maurus slowly spread to monasteries throughout France and by the 11th century had been adopted by Monte Cassino in Italy, along with a revived cult of Saint Placidus. By the late Middle Ages, the cult of Saint Maurus, often associated with that of Saint Placidus, had spread to all Benedictine monasteries. Maurus is venerated even as far as in India, where he is highly honoured in certain areas of the southern state of Kerala. He is the patron of charcoalburners and coppersmiths.

The Blessing of Saint Maur is customarily bestowed on the sick with a relic of the true Cross, in hopes of assisting to restore their health. Since it is often impossible to have a relic of the True Cross, in 1959, the Sacred Congregation of Rites granted permission to use the medal of St. Benedict in place of the relic of the True Cross to confer the Blessing.

The Congregation of St. Maur took its name from him. The surname "Seymour" is derived from Saint Maur.

Iconography
In art, he is depicted as a young man in the garb of a monk, usually holding an abbot's cross or sometimes with a spade (an allusion to the monastery of Saint-Maur-des-Fossés, literally "Saint Maurus of the Ditches"). Another of Saint Maurus' attributes is a crutch, in reference to his patronage of cripples. He was invoked especially against fever, and also against rheumatism, epilepsy, and gout. He is also sometimes depicted with a scale, a reference to the implement used to measure a monk's daily ration of bread, given to him by Benedict when he left Montecassino for France. The monks of Fossés near Paris (whence the community of Glanfeuil had fled from the Vikings in 868) exhibited this implement throughout the Middle Ages.

See also
Roman Catholic Diocese of Saint Maurus
Saint Maurus, patron saint archive
Saint-Maur Abbey

References

Sources
 
Rosa Giorgi; Stefano Zuffi (ed.), Saints in Art (Los Angeles: Getty Publications, 2003), 272.
John B. Wickstrom: "Text and Image in the Making of a Holy Man: An Illustrated Life of Saint Maurus of Glanfeuil (MS Vat. Lat. 1202)," Studies in Iconography 14(1994), 53–85.
Ibid. The Life and Miracles of St. Maurus: Disciple of Benedict, Apostle to France (Kalamazoo, Cistercian Publications, 2008).

External links

 St. Benedict's Abbey - Benedictine Brothers and Fathers in America's Heartland
 The Holy Rule of St. Benedict - Online translation by Rev. Boniface Verheyen, OSB, of St. Benedict's Abbey
 Benedictine College - Dynamically Catholic, Benedictine, Liberal Arts, and Residential
 Maur Hill - Mount Academy - Catholic, college prep boarding school since 1863 for grades 9th-12th.

Attribution

6th-century deaths
Italian Benedictines
Benedictine saints
Benedictine spirituality
Italian Roman Catholic saints
6th-century Christian saints
512 births